Abdu Gusau Polytechnic is a State government polytechnic located in Talata Mafara, Zamfara State, Nigeria.

History 
The polytechnic was established in 1992 after the former Governor of Sokoto State, Yahaya Abdulkarim signed a bill that established the 'Talata Mafara Polythecnic'. The Sokoto state government renamed the Polytechnic to 'Abdu Gusau Polytechnic' in February, 1995. This was done in honor of the late Engineer Abdu Gusau who died in November, 1994, in recognition of his contribution to the development of the State. Zamfara state of Nigeria was created by a Federal decree in 1996, and this necessitated the relocation of the polytechnic to a new permanent site in Talata Mafara. The Sokoto state government was no longer responsible for it, and it wasn't legally possible to have an institution belonging to Zamfara state located in Sokoto.

Present day 
The Polytechnic today, is a fully developed institution with 19 departments, and 2524 students, offering programmes in several fields of study. The institution currently offers ND's (National Diploma) in courses such as; mass communication, banking & finance, civil law, building engineering, electrical engineering and HND's (Higher National Diploma) in office technology management, business, bio chemistry, computer science and statistics.

See Also
Academic libraries in Nigeria

References

Polytechnics in Nigeria
Zamfara State
1992 establishments in Nigeria
Educational institutions established in 1992
Public universities in Nigeria
 Educational institutions in Nigeria